The 2011 Kazakhstan Premier League was the 20th season of the Kazakhstan Premier League, the highest football league competition in Kazakhstan. The season began on 6 March 2011 and ended on 29 October 2011. Tobol were the defending champions having won their first league championship last year.

As in the 2010 season, the competition was completed in two stages, with all twelve clubs playing twice against each other before splitting up into two groups of six teams each, according to their position after 22 matches. However, all earned points after the first stage will be halved this time, with any odd numbers of points being rounded up.
Shakhter won the championship, the teams' first title.

Teams
Akzhayik and FC Okzhetpes were relegated to the Kazakhstan First Division at the end of last season after finishing in the bottom two places of the table. Akzhayik returned to the Kazakhstan First Division after just one season, while Okzhetpes eventually had to leave the Kazakh top league after 15 seasons.

The relegated teams will be replaced by First Division champions Vostok and Kaisar. Both clubs returned to the league after one-year absences.

In further changes, Lokomotiv Astana renamed themselves FC Astana on 20 May 2011.

Personnel and kits

Note: Flags indicate national team as has been defined under FIFA eligibility rules. Players and Managers may hold more than one non-FIFA nationality.

Foreign players
The number of foreign players is restricted to six per KPL team. A team can use only five foreign players on the field in each game.

In bold: Players that have been capped for their national team.

First stage

Standings

Results
During these matches, each team played each other team twice (once at home and once away).

Second stage

Standings

Results
During these matches, each team played every other team in their half of the table twice (once at home and once away).

Top goalscorers
Last updated: 2 November 2011

References

External links
 Official website

Kazakhstan Premier League seasons
1
Kazakh
Kazakh